Pierre de Luxembourg (20 July 1369 – 2 July 1387) was a French Catholic prelate who served as the Bishop of Metz, and as a cardinal of the Avignon Obedience from 1384 until his death.

Pierre was descended from nobles who secured his entrance into the priesthood when he started to serve in several places as a canon before he was named as the Bishop of Metz and a pseudocardinal under an antipope. He was noted for his austerities and successes in diocesan reform as well as for his dedication to the faithful but he tried to end the Western Schism that pitted pope against antipope and rulers against rulers. His efforts were in vain and he was soon driven from Metz but moved to southern France where he died from anorexia as a result of his harsh self-imposed penances.

But both sides in the conflict recognized his deep holiness and his dedication to the people in Metz and elsewhere. There were continual lobbies for him to be beatified and this later materialized when Pope Clement VII beatified him on 9 April 1527 in Rome.

Life

Pierre de Luxembourg was born in mid-1369 in Meuse as the second of six children to Guido de Luxembourg (1340-1371) and Mahaut de Châtillon (1335-1378); the couple married circa 1354. His name originates from the fact that was a 5th generation descendant of Henry V, Count of Luxembourg, and thus belonged to the French branch of the House of Luxembourg. His parents died in his childhood (father when he was two and mother when he was four) which prompted his aunt Jeanne - the countess of Orgières - to raise him in Paris. His siblings were:
 Valeran (1355-12 April 1415)
 Jean (c. 1370–1397)
 André (1374-1396; later Bishop of Cambrai)
 Marie (d. 1391)
 Jeanne
Pierre was the uncle to Louis de Luxembourg and the quasi-cardinal Thibault de Luxembourg; he was the great-granduncle of Philippe de Luxembourg.

In 1381 he travelled to London to offer himself as a hostage to the English to secure his brother's release back to France. The English were so perplexed but enthralled with this offer that his brother was released back to France. This even reached the ears of Richard II who invited him to remain at his court though he decided to go back to Paris to follow Jesus Christ in his vocation to the priesthood.

In 1377 he was sent for his education to the Parisian college where an instructor was the theologian and astrologer Pierre d'Ailly. In 1379 he was selected to be the canon for the cathedral chapter of Notre Dame de Paris. In 1381 he became a canon for the cathedral chapter of Notre Dame de Chartres and was elevated to the position of Archdeacon of Dreux in the Chartres diocese. In 1382 he was selected to be the Archdeacon for Cambrai.

In 1384 the episcopal see of Metz became vacant. The selection of a new bishop was complicated due to the Western Schism in which the Kingdom of France supported Antipope Clement VII while the Emperor supported Pope Urban VI. The antipope named Pierre as the new Bishop of Metz in 1384 and he was enthroned in his new see that September entering barefoot on a mule. He began his diocesan reforms in which he divided revenue into three: the first two were for the Church and the poor while the third would be for his household. He was able to take Metz with armed troops for a brief period of time but was later forced to withdraw sometime in 1385. This was about the same time that Pope Urban VI selected Tilman Vuss de Bettenburg as the legitimate Bishop of Metz.

Pierre was later made a pseudocardinal after King Charles VI and Duke John requested that the antipope elevate him as such. This occurred on 15 April 1384 and he received the diaconal title of San Giorgio in Velabro. During his time as a pseudocardinal he made attempts to end the Western Schism which were all unsuccessful. The antipope invited Pierre on 23 September 1386 to join him at his court in Avignon where he would remain until his death.

Pierre died in mid-1387 from anorexia and fever due to the austerities he had imposed upon himself; he had fallen ill in March. He died at a Carthusian convent in Villeneuve-lès-Avignon in Avignon. His wish was to be buried in a common grave like that of the paupers. Miracles were soon reported to emerge at his tomb prompting his brother Jean to order (on 16 March 1395) the construction of a church dedicated to the sainted Pope Celestine V to which his remains were transferred to.

Beatification
The subject for his canonization was raised at the Council of Basel but without a solid conclusion. In 1432 he was named as the patron saint for Avignon. The vice-legate Sforza placed the town under his protection during a 1640 plague outbreak. His cult following included Metz and Paris in addition to Verdun and Luxembourg. In 1597 his relics were taken to Paris but were damaged during the French Revolution; some relics remain in Saint Didier in Avignon. Pope Urban VIII (in 1629) allowed the Carthusians to celebrate a Mass and the Divine Office in his name.

His beatification had been requested on numerous occasions and Queen Maria of Naples made one such request on 1 February 1388 as did several other nobles and princes. The process had opened on numerous occasions but faced frequent interruptions (1389 and 1390 and later 1433 and 1435) causing its frequent suspension. Pope Clement VII beatified Pierre on 9 April 1527 (some sources suggest 24 March).

References

Further reading
 Conrad Eubel, Hierarchia Catholica Medii Aevi (Münich: Sumptibus et Typis Librariae Regensbergianae, 1913), I, 338.
 Michael J. Walsh, Peter of Luxembourg, A New Dictionary of Saints: East and West, (Liturgical Press, 2007), 483.
 Patricia Healy Wasyliw, Martyrdom, Murder, and Magic: Child Saints and Their Cults in Medieval Europe, (Peter Lang Publishing, 2008), 98.
 Eric Johnson, La Ville Sonnant: The Politics of Sacred Space in Avignon on the Eve of the French Revolution, Defining the Holy: Sacred Space in Medieval and Early Modern Europe, 331.
 Alban Butler and Paul Burns (ed.), Bd. Peter of Luxembourg, Butler's Lives of the Saints, (Burns and Oates, 2000), 16.

External links
 The Cardinals of the Holy Roman Church 
 Genealogy
 Catholic Online
 Diocese of Avignon 

1369 births
1387 deaths
14th-century French cardinals
14th-century Christian saints
14th-century venerated Christians
Bishops of Metz
Deaths from anorexia nervosa
Neurological disease deaths in France
French beatified people
Pierre
Luxembourgian Roman Catholic saints
Medieval Luxembourgian saints
People from Meuse (department)
Venerated Catholics